Chkuaseli is a Georgian surname. Notable people with the surname include:

 Avtandil Chkuaseli (1931–1994), Soviet football goalkeeper
 Nino Chkuaseli (born 1988), Georgian football goalkeeper

Georgian-language surnames